Nkechi Amare Diallo (born Rachel Anne Dolezal, November 12, 1977) is an American former college instructor and activist known for identifying as a transracial black woman. In addition to claiming black ancestry, she also claimed Native American descent. She is also a former National Association for the Advancement of Colored People (NAACP) chapter president.

Dolezal was president of the NAACP chapter in Spokane, Washington, from 2014 until June 2015, when she resigned in the midst of controversy over her racial identity. She was the subject of public scrutiny when her parents publicly stated that she was pretending to be black but was actually white. The statement by Dolezal's parents followed Dolezal's reports to police and local news media that she had been the victim of race-related hate crimes; a police investigation did not find support for her allegations. Dolezal had also claimed on an application form to be mixed-race and had falsely claimed that an African-American man was her father. In the aftermath of the controversy, Dolezal was dismissed from her position as an instructor in Africana studies at Eastern Washington University and was removed from her post as chair of the Police Ombudsman Commission in Spokane over "a pattern of misconduct." In 2015, Dolezal acknowledged that she was "born white to white parents," but maintained that she self-identified as black.

The Dolezal controversy fuelled a national debate in the United States about racial identity. Dolezal's critics stated that she committed cultural appropriation and fraud; Dolezal asserted that her self-identification is genuine. In 2017, Dolezal released a memoir on her racial identity entitled In Full Color: Finding My Place in a Black and White World.

Early life, family, and education
Dolezal was born in Lincoln County, Montana, on November 12, 1977, to Ruthanne (née Schertel) and Lawrence "Larry" Dolezal, who are white and primarily of German, Czech, and Swedish origin; she was born as a blue-eyed blonde with straight hair. Ruthanne and Larry Dolezal were married in 1974. Rachel's surname is of Czech origin. Dolezal has an older biological brother, Joshua Dolezal, who authored a book about their upbringing in Montana. Until resigning in 2021, Joshua Dolezal was a professor of English at Central College in Iowa. When Dolezal was a teenager, her parents adopted three African-American children and one Haitian child.

Dolezal has said she was born and lived in a tipi and that the family had hunted for their food with bow and arrow. She also said that lima beans were used as chess pieces when enjoying family game night. Her mother stated that she and Dolezal's father briefly lived in a tipi in 1974, three years before their daughter was born and that Dolezal's claims were "totally false". From 2002 to 2006, her parents and siblings lived in South Africa as Christian missionaries. Dolezal said she lived in South Africa as a child, but her family disputes the claim.

Dolezal was raised in Troy in the Pentecostal faith. She has stated that her parents frequently abused her. In a 2017 interview, she said she was taught to believe that "everything that came naturally, instinctively was wrong"—a point that was "literally beaten into us". In a 2015 interview, Dolezal said she was "punished by skin complexion" by her mother and "white stepfather", and compared this alleged punishment to the punishment suffered by black slaves.

Dolezal was homeschooled via the Christian Liberty Academy CLASS program, achieving a 4.0 grade point average (GPA). She was one of several co-valedictorians upon graduation in 1996. She won a $2,000 scholarship for college awarded by Tandy Leather for her entry in their 1996 Leather Art contest. In 1998, she entered artworks at Spokane's annual Juneteenth celebration; she expressed African-American themes through collages and mixed-media works.

Following the completion of high school, Dolezal attended Belhaven University in Jackson, Mississippi, receiving her bachelor's degree in 2000. She then attended Howard University, a historically black college in Washington, D.C.; she received a Master of Fine Arts, summa cum laude, from Howard in 2002. Her thesis at Howard was a series of paintings presented from the perspective of a black man. Dolezal later said that she was drugged and sexually assaulted by a "trusted mentor" when attending Howard University, and that "suing was nearly impossible".

In 2000, Dolezal married Kevin Moore, a black man. Moore, a medical student at Howard University at the time of their marriage, divorced Dolezal in 2005.  Dolezal and Moore have a son.

In 2010, with the consent of her parents, Dolezal obtained legal guardianship of her 16-year-old brother, Izaiah Dolezal. Izaiah sought to be emancipated after alleging that Larry and Ruthanne not only beat him and his siblings, but also threatened to send them to group homes if they did not obey their rules. Her brother, Ezra Dolezal, later denied Izaiah's accusations in an interview with CNN; however, in an interview with BuzzFeed, he acknowledged that his parents were strict and sometimes used corporal punishment.

Dolezal gave birth to another son in February 2016.

Lawsuit against Howard University

In 2002, Dolezal unsuccessfully sued Howard University for discrimination based on "race, pregnancy, family responsibilities, and gender, as well as retaliation". Her lawsuit alleged that she was denied scholarship funds, a teaching assistant position, and other opportunities because she was a white woman. She also alleged that the removal of her artwork from a student exhibition at Howard in 2001 "was motivated by a discriminatory purpose to favor African-American students" over her.

Career

Art
Dolezal created a fountain sculpture titled "Triumph of the Human Spirit" that consisted of a tall column with troubled, sad figures at its base and dancing, celebrating figures further up the column. It was installed in downtown Spokane in June 2005 and was later auctioned off to benefit the Human Rights Education Institute.

In 2007, while working as an art teacher at School Indigo in Coeur d'Alene, Idaho, Dolezal collaborated with children to make five works for a "Rights of the Child" exhibit by the Human Rights Education Institute.

Plagiarism accusations

In June 2015, Priscilla Frank at The Huffington Post and Sarah Cascone at Artnet made accusations of plagiarism against Dolezal. A Dolezal painting titled The Shape of Our Kind was alleged to be nearly identical to J. M. W. Turner's 1840 work, The Slave Ship. Frank accused Dolezal of plagiarism for not crediting Turner.

Civil rights activism

Human Rights Institute
A July 2010 newspaper article indicated that Dolezal had stepped down as education director of the Human Rights Institute in Coeur d'Alene, Idaho, after having served in that capacity for two years. Dolezal indicated that she was, "for all intents and purposes", forced to resign from the organization after its board declined to hire her as its executive director.

NAACP

Dolezal was elected president of the Spokane chapter of the NAACP in 2014, replacing James Wilburn. During her brief tenure, she was noted for revitalizing the chapter. Her resignation from the civil rights organization was announced on June 15, 2015, after the controversy surrounding her racial identity became public.

Police Ombudsman Commission
Dolezal applied for the position of chair of the Office of the Police Ombudsman Commission in Spokane in May 2014, and was subsequently appointed by Mayor David Condon. In her application, she identified herself as having several ethnicities, including black. In June 2015, City Council President Ben Stuckart said the city had opened an investigation of the truthfulness of her application. On June 17, 2015, the investigation concluded that she had acted improperly, violated government rules and abused her authority, and the report said the evidence and interviews confirmed workplace harassment allegations and "a pattern of misconduct" by Dolezal. Dolezal was asked to resign by Condon and Stuckart due to "intimidating and harassing" behavior. On June 18, 2015, the Spokane City Council voted unanimously to remove Dolezal from her position as chair of the Police Ombudsman Commission.

Teaching and writing
In 2015, Eastern Washington University stated that "since 2010, Rachel Dolezal has been hired at Eastern Washington University on a quarter-by-quarter basis as an instructor in the Africana Education program. This is a part-time position to address program needs. Dolezal is not a professor." She taught "The Black Woman's Struggle", "African and African American Art History", "African History", "African American Culture", and "Intro to Africana Studies". A statement by university officials on June 15, 2015, indicated that Dolezal was "no longer an employee of Eastern Washington University". Despite not being a professor, she used the title "professor" on several websites.

Dolezal was a frequent contributor to The Inlander, an alternative weekly newspaper in Spokane.

Dolezal released a memoir on her racial identity titled In Full Color: Finding My Place in a Black and White World in March 2017.

Other work
Dolezal later worked as a hair stylist, specializing in weaves and braids. She also creates and sells her own artwork. She has stated that in the past she worked as a sushi chef. She has an OnlyFans account, where it is reported that she will post pictures of herself engaging in activities such as working out as well as pictures of her feet.

Racial identity

General

Dolezal is a person of Northern and Central European ancestry; her father has stated that their family is of primarily European descent and "a small amount of American Indian". Dolezal identifies as black.

According to her brother Ezra, Dolezal began changing her appearance as early as 2009, when she began using hair products that she had seen Ezra's biological sister use. She began darkening her skin and perming her hair sometime around 2011. When Ezra moved in with Rachel in 2012, she told him that Spokane-area residents knew her as black and said, "Don't blow my cover."

Dolezal has claimed to be a victim of race-related harassment. Dolezal stated on September 29, 2009, to KXLY that a noose had been left on her porch. In July 2010, Dolezal resigned from Human Rights Education Institute in Kootenai County and stated to KREM 2 News that "she had been the target of discrimination". Dolezal's biography on Eastern Washington University's website stated that while she was living in Idaho, "at least eight documented hate crimes targeted (Rachel) Dolezal and her children". Dolezal reportedly made several reports of harassment and other crimes to police in Idaho and Washington, including that she had received a hate mail package at her NAACP post office box and that a swastika was placed on the door of the Human Rights Education Institute, where she had previously worked. Regarding the hate mail package, detectives said the envelope that contained the alleged threats had no postage stamps, barcodes or any other indication of having been handled by the postal service. The postal inspector said, "The only way this letter could have ended up in this P.O. box would be if it was placed there by someone with a key to that box or a USPS employee." According to the Spokesman Review, as of 2015, none of Dolezal's allegations had resulted in an arrest or in the filing of criminal charges.

Dolezal's uncle, Dan Dolezal, has stated that his niece first claimed that a black friend named Albert Wilkerson was her real father in 2012 or 2013. In another 2015 interview, Dolezal made reference to her "stepfather". Dolezal's mother has said she has never met Albert Wilkerson and that Dolezal does not have a stepfather. Following the public controversy surrounding her identity, Dolezal later acknowledged that she had met Wilkerson while living in Idaho and that she considered him her "dad".

In her 2014 application for the position of chair of the Office of the Police Ombudsman Commission in Spokane, Dolezal identified herself as having several ethnicities, including black.  She has said that she is of "African American, Native American, German, Czech, Swedish, Jewish and Arabic" heritage. In an article she wrote for The Inlander in March 2015, Dolezal included herself when discussing black women through use of the pronouns "we" and "our".

Controversy
Dolezal's self-identification as black became the subject of public controversy in June 2015.

In a June 10, 2015, interview about various alleged hate crimes that Dolezal had reported, KXLY-TV reporter Jeff Humphrey asked Dolezal about a Facebook post in which Dolezal identified Albert Wilkerson as her dad. The following is a partial transcript of the exchange:

On June 11, Jeff Selle and Maureen Dolan of the Coeur d'Alene Press published an article entitled "Black Like Me?" The article reported that Dolezal had "made claims in the media and elsewhere about her ethnicity, race and background that are contradicted by her biological parents", and went on to outline Dolezal's past hate crimes allegations, allegations of being abused with a baboon whip by her parents, misrepresentations about her race, and misrepresentations about the identity of her father. The article further stated that Dolezal, in a recent interview, "maintained that she is African-American. 'They can DNA test me if they want to,' she said. 'I would caution you on all of this. This is ridiculous. Ruthanne Dolezal was quoted in the article, stating that her daughter's allegation of being abused with a baboon whip was "a very false and malicious lie" and adding that it was "disturbing that she has become so dishonest".

People later reported on the circumstances leading up to the publication of "Black Like Me?" According to People, Selle had learned of Dolezal's allegation that a package containing racist threats against her was delivered to the post office box of the Spokane, Washington, NAACP. Selle recalled that Dolezal had made similar allegations when she was living in Coeur d'Alene, and that the allegations were not substantiated. Sensing a potential story, Selle discovered that Dolezal had identified Wilkerson as her father; when contacted, Wilkerson contradicted this assertion. Dolan then discovered a photo of Dolezal's actual parents on the internet, and Selle made contact with them. Larry and Ruthanne Dolezal gave Selle pictures of "their naturally blond, fair-skinned daughter" and a copy of her birth certificate.

The controversy surrounding Dolezal's ancestry and identity became national news.

Reactions to the controversy
After the controversy regarding Dolezal's racial identity became public, the NAACP released a statement in support of her leadership. However, a petition calling for her to resign her position as President of the Spokane chapter of the NAACP was launched. Dolezal stepped down from her position at the NAACP on June 15, 2015.

An investigation into Dolezal's behavior as chair of the Office of the Police Ombudsman Commission in Spokane concluded that she had engaged in "a pattern of misconduct". On June 18, 2015, the Spokane City Council voted unanimously to remove Dolezal from her position as chair.

On June 15, 2015, The Inlander (a publication to which Dolezal had contributed) announced that it had cut ties with Dolezal, saying that they felt "manipulated and deceived".

The revelations about Dolezal's ancestry and her other claims provoked a range of reactions. Dolezal's critics argued that she committed cultural appropriation and fraud. However, others said that Dolezal's asserted identity should be respected. Angela Schwendiman, a colleague of Dolezal's at Eastern Washington University, expressed her belief that Dolezal perceived herself as black internally, and that "she was only trying to match how she felt on the inside with her outside". Similarly Cedric Bradley, a colleague of hers at Spokane's NAACP, suggested it mattered little to him whether Dolezal was actually black or not. What did matter to him was her proven track record in social justice work. "It's not about black and white", Bradley stated, "it's about what we can do for the community".

In June 2015, psychologist Halford Fairchild said, "Rachel Dolezal is black because she identifies as black. Her identity was authentic, as far as I could tell." Sociologist Ann Morning also defended Dolezal, saying: "We're getting more and more used to the idea that people's racial affiliation and identity and sense of belonging can change, or can vary, with different circumstances." Washington Post journalist Krissah Thompson described her behavior as "white guilt played to its end". Thompson discussed the issue with psychologist Derald Wing Sue, an expert on racial identity, who suggested that Dolezal had become so fascinated by racism and racial justice issues that she "over-identified" with black people.

Gender studies scholar Samantha Allen said, "Rachel Dolezal seems determined to appropriate not just blackness but the rhetoric of transgender identity as well" and called the analogy "spurious". Washington Post journalist Jonathan Capehart suggested, "blackface remains highly racist, no matter how down with the cause a white person is". Her brother Ezra Dolezal also compared his sister's behavior to blackface and said "she's basically creating more racism".

In December 2017, Shawn Vestal of The Spokesman-Review called Dolezal "Spokane's undisputed heavyweight champion of racial appropriation".

The Dolezal case led to a debate in scholarship as to whether transracial identity can be compared to transgender identity.

On news outlets and social media, Dolezal has been compared to Sacheen Littlefeather, an American woman who passed as Native American and took the stage on the 1973 45th Academy Awards (the Oscars), for the fact that they both falsely self-identified with a culture or ethnicity that was not theirs, for personal gain and promotion.

Responses from Dolezal 
Dolezal has asserted that her self-identification is genuine, even though it is not based on ancestry.

Dolezal issued a statement on June 15, 2015, asserting that "challenging the construct of race is at the core of evolving human consciousness". The following day, Dolezal told Today Show host Matt Lauer she was first described as "transracial" and "biracial" in articles about her human rights work, and chose not to correct them. In the same interview, she said the way she presented herself was "not some freak, Birth of a Nation, mockery blackface performance". Dolezal later said that she has never claimed to be "transracial", a term associated mainly with transracial adoption. In a March 27, 2017, interview Dolezal said she identified as "trans-black".

Dolezal alleged that the Spokane police chief had tired of dealing with her and had asked a private investigator to find out more information on her; while the private investigator in question (Ted Pulver) acknowledged having investigated Dolezal, both he and the attorney for the police chief denied that the police chief had hired Pulver.

In subsequent interviews, Dolezal stated that she considered herself to be black. In a November 2, 2015, interview on The Real, Dolezal publicly acknowledged for the first time since the controversy began that she was "biologically born white to white parents", but maintained that she identified as black.

In a February 2017 interview with The Guardian, Dolezal reasoned that race is more fluid than gender because race is an entirely social construct. She stated, "I feel that I was born with the essential essence of who I am, whether it matches my anatomy and complexion or not ... I've never questioned being a girl or woman, for example, but whiteness has always felt foreign to me, for as long as I can remember." She added, "I didn't choose to feel this way or be this way, I just am. What other choice is there than to be exactly who we are?" Critics took issue with Dolezal's logic. The Guardian columnist Claire Hynes wrote, "Dolezal is correct to argue that race is largely a social construct rather than a science", but "what defines people of colour is a limited ability to control how we are viewed, and a lack of freedom to 'write our own stories'."

In popular culture 
In June 2015, Maya Rudolph did an impression of Dolezal on Late Night with Seth Meyers. In 2016, Deborah Theaker played a parody of Dolezal on Lady Dynamite.

In 2018, a documentary entitled The Rachel Divide aired. The film was directed by Laura Brownson and distributed by Netflix. The documentary explored Dolezal's 2015 racial identity controversy, the circumstances surrounding it, and its aftermath. The documentary received mixed reviews. Vogue gave the filmmaker credit for "balanced treatment of her deeply problematic subject matter". The New Yorker noted the film's portrait of family dynamics. "Eventually, Brownson locates the real story: a primitive power game between mother and child, one that forecasts calamity. And it is in this mode that The Rachel Divide becomes a disturbing and enthralling drama of the American family, the pain of its truths and its fictions."

A character based on Rachel was also portrayed in a fictional Broadway show in the series finale of Younger.

In October 2022, the UK's Channel 4 show, Jimmy Carr Destroys Art, put her sculpture Misaligned Mind, to an audience vote, the audience electing to have Jimmy Carr destroy her work, over that of John Leach's cartoon Dis-united States; in a show that voted on the destruction of artwork by Adolf Hitler, Eric Gill, Marcus Harvey, Pablo Picasso, Rolf Harris, and Sally Mann.

Personal life

According to a February 2015 article in The Easterner, Dolezal said she had suffered from cervical cancer in 2006, but had recovered by 2008. Dolezal's brother, Ezra Dolezal, has stated that he does not believe this to be true.

She has also stated that she has been diagnosed with post-traumatic stress disorder (PTSD).

In October 2016, Dolezal legally changed her name to a Nigerian phrase that means "gift of God". She later clarified that she still intends to use the name Rachel Dolezal "as her public persona", but that she changed her name to have a better chance of landing work.

Welfare fraud
In February 2017, Dolezal was receiving food stamps. She said she was on the brink of homelessness and unable to find employment.

In May 2018, Dolezal was charged with second-degree perjury and felony theft by welfare fraud by the Washington State Department of Social and Health Services. The charges were filed after it was revealed that she had received $8,847 in food and childcare assistance between August 2015 and December 2017. During that period, she had received tens of thousands of dollars in unreported income, but had told the state that her income was less than $500 per month. State investigators discovered that, after her book was published, approximately $83,924 had been deposited into her bank account in monthly installments between August 2015 and September 2017. According to the Spokane County prosecutor's office, Dolezal could have received a sentence of up to 15 years in prison if she was found guilty. She entered into a diversion agreement on March 25, 2019, agreeing to repay her assistance benefits and complete 120 hours of community service to avoid a trial.

Notes

References

See also 
 
 Racial misrepresentation
 Cultural appropriation
 Hypatia transracialism controversy
 Sacheen Littlefeather

External links

 Dolezal's art blog

1977 births
African-American-related controversies
American feminists
American memoirists
American people of German descent
American people of Czech descent
American people of Swedish descent
American people who self-identify as being of Native American descent
Artists from Spokane, Washington
Belhaven University alumni
Bisexual artists
Bisexual feminists
Bisexual women
Feminist artists
Howard University alumni
Impostors
2015 controversies in the United States
American LGBT artists
LGBT people from Idaho
LGBT people from Montana
LGBT people from Washington (state)
Living people
NAACP activists
People from Coeur d'Alene, Idaho
People from Lincoln County, Montana
People involved in plagiarism controversies
Multiracial affairs in the United States
American women memoirists
Transracial activists
21st-century American women
OnlyFans creators